Taichung Municipal Taichung Girls' Senior High School (TCGS; , also 台中女中) is a senior high school in West District, Taichung, Taiwan.

Taichung Girls' Senior High School is one of the most selective high schools in Taichung and is frequently referred to as one of Taiwan's "Star High Schools".

The school has a well-known marching band that has been invited to perform at events such as the Taichung City National Day celebrations.

Notable alumnae 
 Chyi Yu, singer
 Kolas Yotaka, Taiwanese politician 
 Lulu Huang Lu Zi Yin, television host, singer and actress

References

External links 
過去與現在－台中女中歷史照片 

Education in Taiwan
Educational institutions established in 1919
1919 establishments in Taiwan